Croaked: Frog Monster from Hell (also known as Rana: The Legend of Shadow Lake) is a 1981 American monster movie  directed by Bill Rebane. The plot of Croaked involves a group of loggers terrorized by a vicious half-man/half-frog creature. The film was distributed by Troma Entertainment.

In his book All I Need to Know about Filmmaking I Learned from the Toxic Avenger, Troma president Lloyd Kaufman lists this film as one of the five best Troma films ever made (along with The Capture of Bigfoot, also directed by Bill Rebane).

Plot

When a fortune is discovered at the bottom of a lake, a diver is out to get it, even when he discovers that the loot is being guarded by an awful underwater beast.

Cast
 Paul Callaway and Richard Lange as Rana
 Glenn Scherer as Kelly Sr.
 Brad Ellingson as Kelly Jr.
 Karen McDiarmid as Elli
 Alan Ross as John
 Julie Wheaton as Susan
 Jerry Gregoris as Charlie
 Jim Iaquinta as Burley, Rana
 Bruno Alexander as Cal
 Michael Skewes as Mike
 Doreen Moze as Chris
 Angailica as Baby Rana (as Angel Rebane)

Release

Home Media
The film was released on VHS in 1991 by Burbank. It was released for the first time on DVD by BCI, in a 3-disk multi feature set on August 24, 2004. BCI would re-release the film as a part of a 10-disk multi feature collection on October 5, 2005.

Release names

1. Rana: The Legend Of Shadow Lake (1981).
2. Croaked: Frog Monster From Hell (1991) as VHS.

Reception

John Noonan from HorrorNews.net wrote, "By all accounts this should be a fun and frivolous massacred by Mother Nature genre of movie. Instead, even at an 86 minute running time, it feels like Croaked is charging through treacle towards a wholly unsurprising and unsatisfying ending."

References

External links
 

 

Films directed by Bill Rebane
1982 films
1982 horror films
American independent films
American monster movies
1980s monster movies
Troma Entertainment films
1980s English-language films
1980s American films